Anton Flettner, Flugzeugbau GmbH was a German helicopter and autogyro manufacturer during World War II, founded by Anton Flettner.

Flettner aircraft included:
Flettner Fl 184 - Reconnaissance autogyro, prototype
Flettner Fl 185 - Reconnaissance helicopter, prototype
Flettner Fl 265 - Reconnaissance helicopter, prototype
Flettner Fl 282 Kolibri (Hummingbird) - Reconnaissance helicopter
Flettner Fl 339 - Reconnaissance helicopter, project
Flettner Gigant - Experimental helicopter

Anton Flettner's interest in aerodynamics (specifically the Magnus effect, which produces a force from a cylinder rotating in a fluid flow) also led him to invent the Flettner rotor which he used to power a Flettner ship which crossed the Atlantic, and the Flettner ventilator which is still widely used as a cooling device for buses, vans and other commercial vehicles and which is based upon the Savonius principle.

See also
 Gyrodyne
 List of RLM aircraft designations

References 

Defunct aircraft manufacturers of Germany
Helicopter manufacturers of Germany
Defunct helicopter manufacturers of Germany